Ottobine is a small unincorporated community located on State Route 257 near Harrisonburg, in Rockingham County, Virginia, United States. It consists of spread out communities, a convenience gas/grocery store, and many farms. This area is partly inhabited by Mennonites and contains many churches.

External links

 Ottobine, Virginia community website

Mennonitism in Virginia
Unincorporated communities in Rockingham County, Virginia
Unincorporated communities in Virginia